Vincent Regeling (born 7 May 1997) is a Dutch professional footballer who plays as a defender for Eerste Divisie club Telstar.

Club career
Born in Heemstede, Regeling played in the youth academies of SV Hoofddorp, HFC Haarlem and RKSV Pancratius, before joining the AZ youth system. He made his Eerste Divisie debut for Jong AZ on 1 September 2017 in a game against Jong FC Utrecht. His contract with AZ expired in the summer of 2020.

On 4 September 2020, Regeling signed a two-year contract with Telstar. He made his debut on 13 September in a 1–2 home loss to MVV, playing the full match.

Personal life
Born in the Netherlands, Regeling is of Surinamese descent.

References

External links
 

1997 births
People from Heemstede
Living people
Dutch footballers
Dutch sportspeople of Surinamese descent
Eerste Divisie players
Association football defenders
Jong AZ players
SC Telstar players
Footballers from North Holland